Malmesbury School in Malmesbury, Wiltshire, England, was founded in 1971 with the merger of Malmesbury Grammar School at Filands with Bremhilam Secondary Modern at Corn Gastons.

Until 2002, the school operated on two sites, with the lower school (years 7 and 8) at Filands and the upper school (years 9 to 13) at Corn Gastons. In 2002, the school moved into new buildings on the Corn Gastons site, funded by a public-private partnership between the local authority and the White Horse Education Partnership. The new building was formally opened by polar explorer David Hempleman-Adams on 2 May 2003.

In 2008, Malmesbury School became a foundation school. In 2011 it became an academy.

In 2014, the school introduced a new grey and black uniform for years 7–11, which featured a tie in the house colours.

Awards and specialisms 
In 2004 Malmesbury School became a Specialist School for Science and Performing Arts, earned High Performing Specialist School status in 2008, and was awarded a second specialism in Maths and Computing in 2009.  In addition, the school holds the following accreditations:

 Governor Mark
 Artsmark Award
 International School Award
 Eco-Schools Award
 Healthy Schools	
 Fairtrade Status
 Investors in People
 SSAT Consultant School
 Edward de Bono Thinking School
 Ofsted Outstanding
Platinum Science Mark Winner 2018-2021

The Athelstan Trust
In March 2015 The Dean Academy in Lydney, Gloucestershire became sponsored by Malmesbury School Academy Trust, and the Trust was renamed The Athelstan Trust. Bradon Forest School in Purton, Wiltshire joined the Trust in September 2015, and Sir William Romney's School in Tetbury, Gloucestershire, joined in April 2020. Chipping Sodbury School joined the Trust in April 2021.

Creative Arts 
There are several music groups students can join while at the school, most notably the choir and orchestra. Also available are a big band, string group and a chamber choir.

At the start of December each year, the school holds a Christmas Concert, which showcases soloists as well as whole company numbers involving choir and orchestra. In the past the school has also held Summer Concerts, named after the Summer Proms. The school holds a Carol Service and Chamber Concert at Malmesbury Abbey once a year, at which more traditional music is played.

The school also runs a production each year, in which any student is welcome to take part. Previous plays have included Oh! What a Lovely War and Grease.

A number of the school's students perform at WOMAD, an annual music festival at Charlton Park near Malmesbury.

Houses 
The school has four houses, Athelstan, Eilmer, Hobbes and William, named for local heroes:
King Athelstan, the first King of England (Green)
Eilmer of Malmesbury, the 12th-century flying monk (Yellow)
Thomas Hobbes, the 17th-century Philosopher (Red)
William of Malmesbury, the 12th-century monk, historian and author of Gesta Regum Anglorum (Blue)

During the year students can earn house points for outstanding work, contribution or care: the house with the most points at the end of the year wins the House Cup. Houses can also win the Challenge Cup (for performing well in the Challenge Days at the end of the year) or the Charity Cup (for fundraising or donating the most to the house charity).

References

External links 
 
 Ofsted Reports ( before academy conversion)

Academies in Wiltshire
Malmesbury
Secondary schools in Wiltshire